Ecsenius namiyei, commonly called black comb-tooth blenny or Namiye's coralblenny, is a species of marine fish in the family Blenniidae. The specific name honours the Japanese zoologist and museum curator Motoyoshi Namiye (1854-1915).

The black comb-tooth is widespread throughout the tropical waters of the western Pacific Ocean from the Philippines to Solomon Islands.

It grows to a size of 11 cm in length.

It occasionally makes its way into the aquarium trade.

References

External links
http://www.marinespecies.org/aphia.php?p=taxdetails&id=277668
 
 

namiyei
Fish described in 1902
Taxa named by David Starr Jordan